Katutu, the Blind  is a 1953 film.

Synopsis
A young African girl devoted to the inhabitants of her village is seriously injured and taken to the white man's hospital. As she lies on her deathbed, she insists on seeing Katutu, an elderly blind man and a professed pagan. She then states her last wishes; she wants Katutu to convert to Catholicism.

References

 

1953 films
Belgian drama films
Belgian black-and-white films